Song of Farewell (French: La chanson de l'adieu) is a 1934 historical musical drama film directed by Albert Valentin and Géza von Bolváry and starring Jean Servais, Janine Crispin and Lucienne Le Marchand. It is based on the life of the composer Frédéric Chopin and his relationship with George Sand.

It was produced by the German company Boston Films as the French-language version of the German film Farewell Waltz. Such multiple-language versions were common in the early years of sound before dubbing became widespread. The film's sets were designed by the art director Arthur Schwarz.

Cast
 Jean Servais as Frédéric Chopin
 Janine Crispin as Constantia Glodkowska
 Lucienne Le Marchand as George Sand
 Marcel André as Friedrich Karlbrenner
 Daniel Lecourtois as Franz Liszt
 Marcel Vallée as Professor Josef Elsner
 Erna Morena as La Baronne d'Orléans
 Paul Asselin	
 Christiane Dor	
 Jean Fay		
 Catherine Fonteney	
 Pierre Sergeol		
 Marc Valbel

References

Bibliography 
 Mitchell, Charles P. The Great Composers Portrayed on Film, 1913 through 2002. McFarland, 2004.

External links 
 

1930s musical drama films
German musical drama films
1934 films
German historical films
1930s historical films
Films set in the 19th century
Films of Nazi Germany
1930s French-language films
Films directed by Géza von Bolváry
Films directed by Albert Valentin
Tobis Film films
1930s German films